Moriya may refer to:

Moriya, Ibaraki, a city located in Ibaraki Prefecture, Japan
Moriya (surname), a Japanese surname
House of Moriya (463-691), a royal dynasty that ruled over the Anuradhapura Kingdom (in what is now Sri Lanka) from 463 to 691 CE
Mount Moriya, a mountain of Graham Land, Antarctica
Moriya, a Jewish youth organization in the United States
Suwako Moriya, a fictional character from the popular bullet hell series Touhou Project List of Touhou Project characters#Suwako Moriya
Moreya, a Shinto deity, also spelled Moriya

People with the given name
Moriya Jutanugarn (born 1994), a female Thai professional golfer
, Japanese sumo wrestler